Marseille XIII Avenir are a French Rugby league club based in Marseille, Bouches-du-Rhône in the Provence-Alpes-Côte d'Azur region. The club plays in the French National Division 2. The club was founded in 1946 and then re-founded in 2007. It plays its matches at the Stade Roger Couderc.
In addition to the open age team, the club also has a women's team and a thriving junior section.

History

Marseille XIII 

Marseille XIII were formed in 1946 on the restart of Rugby League after its banning by the French Vichy Government during the Second World War. By the end of the 1950s they had played in four French Rugby League Championship finals and contested four Lord Derby Cup finals. They won their first trophy in Season 1947/48, when they reached the final of the cup and beat favourites AS Carcassonne 5–4. The following season they retained the cup by beating AS Carcassonne again, this time 12–9 in front of a crowd of 24,000 at their own home ground the Stade Velodrome.  They beat AS Carcassonne in the league final 12–5. Over the next five years they were runners-up in the league three times, in 1949/50 they lost to rivals AS Carcassonne 7-21 and in 1951/52 they lost to the same opponents, this time going down 6–18. Bordeaux XIII beat them 7–4 in 1954 and the next season they lost in the cup final 10–18 to SO Avignon. Their wait for a trophy ended in 1957 when they won the cup for a third time beating XIII Catalan 11–0. At the start of the year Marseille had played host to the touring Australians, losing 7–37. Another cup triumph in 1965 against AS Carcassonne 13–8, was the club's only finals appearance of the 1960s a decade that had begun with the club again hosting Australia. In 1971 the club beat Lézignan Sangliers in the cup game 17–2. In season 1972/73 Marseille reached the league final but were beaten 0–18 against Toulouse Olympique and in 1975 they lost the cup final to Pia XIII 4–9. There then followed some barren and bleak times and during the early 1990s the club suffered relegation for the first time after getting into financial trouble. The club spent a decade in the second tier until in 2005 they regained their top flight place back after beating RC Carpentras XIII 12–10. During the following season Marseille XIII were declared bankrupt and wound up.

Marseille XIII Avenir 
Born out of the ashes of the original club, Avenir were forced to start the following season, 2007/08, in the 3rd tier of French rugby league, the National Division 1. Since the reformation the club's juniors have been crowned champions in 2009 and the women's team after finishing runner-up in 2011 lifted the title in 2012. At the end of season 2015/16 the club were relegated to the 4th tier National Division 2.

Stadium 
The Stade Velodrome was the club's first home ground at the time of use it had a 25,000 capacity. Other stadiums in Marseille that have been used are the Stade Louis Camelio a rugby stadium, the Stade La Martine opened in 1964, which now hosts football club Marseille Consolat and their present home the Stade Roger Couderc which was opened in 1946 and has been used by Avenir since 2007.

Marseille v Australia

Notable players 
 Jean Dop
 Younes Khattabi
 Jacky Merquey
 Andre Ferren
 Elie Brousse
 Francois Rinaldi

Honours 
 French Rugby League Championship (Elite One) (1): 1948-49
 Lord Derby Cup (5): 1948, 1949, 1957, 1965, 1971
 Elite Two Championship (1): 2004-05

References

External links 

Club Blog

French rugby league teams
2007 establishments in France
Rugby clubs established in 2007